Stiretrus is a genus of predatory stink bugs in the family Pentatomidae. There are about six described species in Stiretrus.

Species
These eight species belong to the genus Stiretrus:
 Stiretrus anchorago (Fabricius, 1775) (anchor stink bug)
 Stiretrus bifrenatus Breddin, 1906
 Stiretrus cinctellus Germar, 1839
 Stiretrus decastigmus Herrich-Schäffer, 1838
 Stiretrus decemguttatus (Lepeletier & Serville, 1828)
 Stiretrus erythrocephalus (Lepeletier & Serville, 1828)
 Stiretrus loratus Germar, 1839
 Stiretrus quinquepunctatus Germar, 1839

References

Further reading

External links

 

Asopinae
Pentatomidae genera
Articles created by Qbugbot